Eric "sheets" Haber (born January 11, 1967) is an American professional poker player and hedge fund manager from Syosset, New York.

In the world of online poker, the top professionals are known by their screen-names first and their real names second, if at all. Eric Haber has earned a level of success in live events that his real name is fairly well known, but he is still known as "sheets" to millions of poker players who first encountered him on the Internet.

Haber is the lead instructor, along with Cliff "JohnnyBax" Josephy, at PokerXFactor.com, an online poker training center that features videos of professional players as they play poker online.

Josephy and Haber backed 2009 World Series of Poker Main Event Champion Joe Cada in his $10,000 buy-in run that earned him $8,546,435, half of which went to his backers.

On March 13, 2008, Haber won the $5,150 No Limit Hold'em World Series of Poker circuit Championship Event, winning $431,136.

As of 2008, his total live tournament winnings exceeded $890,000, and his online tournament winnings exceed  $2,000,000.

References

1967 births
Living people
American poker players
World Series of Poker Circuit event winners
People from Syosset, New York